The Stark Round Barn near Unityville, South Dakota, United States, is a round barn that was built in 1921.  It was listed on the National Register of Historic Places in 2001.

References

Barns on the National Register of Historic Places in South Dakota
Buildings and structures completed in 1921
Buildings and structures in McCook County, South Dakota
Round barns in South Dakota
National Register of Historic Places in McCook County, South Dakota